It's About You is a 2012 music documentary film directed by father and son duo Ian & Kurt Markus. The films focus regards John Mellencamp's 2009 tour with Bob Dylan and Willie Nelson, and the recording of his new album in the month and a half of the tour.

The film was shot entirely in the Super 8 format.

Production
Prior to filming, Kurt Markus and Mellencamp had been friends for twenty years. The two had shared a vision of the decline of small-town American life, shown when the tour drives through towns like Littlefield, Texas. Neither Kurt Markus, Ian Markus, Willie Nelson, or Bob Dylan appear on screen; there is no interview with Mellencamp.

Kurt Markus, who narrates the film, summed up the film:

Release
The film premiered on March 12, 2011 at the South by Southwest film festival. It released in theatres on 4 January 2012.

Critical reception
The film opened to mixed-to-positive reviews from critics. On Metacritic, the film has a rating of 55 based on 11 critic reviews, indicating mixed or average reviews.

References

External links
 
 
 

2012 films
Documentary films about rock music and musicians
American documentary films
2012 documentary films
2010s English-language films
2010s American films